The Charles P. Daly Medal is awarded to individuals by the American Geographical Society (AGS) "for valuable or distinguished geographical services or labors." The medal was established in 1902. This medal was originally designed by Victor D. Brenner, but the destruction of the dies caused the medal to be redesigned in 1924 by Brenda Putnam.

History
Charles P. Daly was President of the AGS from 1864 until September 19, 1899. However, during this time he rose to prominence in New York State as a Judge on the Court of Common Pleas and became Chief Justice in 1871. In 1902, Daly’s willed funds were used to establish this medal.

Recipients
Source: American Geographical Society

 1902: Robert E. Peary
 1906: Thorvald Thoroddsen
 1908: George Davidson
 1909: Charles Chaille-Long, William W. Rockhill
 1910: Grove Karl Gilbert
 1912: Roald Amundsen
 1913: Alfred Hulse Brooks
 1914: Albrecht Penck
 1915: Paul Vidal de la Blache
 1917: George G. Chisholm
 1918: Vilhjalmur Stefansson
 1920: George Otis Smith
 1922: Adolphus Washington Greely, Ernest de K. Leffingwell, Sir Francis Younghusband
 1924: Claude H. Birdseye, Knud Rasmussen
 1925: Robert A. Bartlett, David L. Brainard
 1927: Alois Musil
 1929: Emile Felix Gautier, Filippo De Filippi
 1930: Nelson H. Darton, Lauge Koch, Joseph B. Tyrrell
 1931: Gunnar Isachsen
 1935: Roy Chapman Andrews
 1938: Alexander Forbes
 1939: Herbert John Fleure
 1940: Carl Ortwin Sauer
 1941: Julio Garzon Nieto
 1943: Sir Halford J. Mackinder
 1948: Henri Baulig
 1950: Laurence Dudley Stamp
 1952: James Mann Wordie
 1954: John Kirtland Wright
 1956: Raoul Blanchard
 1959: Richard Hartshorne
 1961: Theodore Monod
 1962: Osborn Maitland Miller
 1963: Henry Clifford Darby
 1964: Jean Gottmann
 1965: William Skinner Cooper
 1966: Torsten Hägerstrand
 1967: Marston Bates
 1968: O. H. K. Spate
 1969: Paul B. Sears, William O. Field
 1971: Gilbert F. White
 1973: Walter Sullivan
 1974: Walter A. Wood
 1978: Roman Drazniowsky
 1985: Wolfgang Meckelein
 1986: Donald W. Meinig
 1991: Robert P. Sharp
 1999: John R. Mather
 2011: Mary Lynne Bird
 2016: Robert Kates

See also

 List of geography awards

References

Further reading

External links
 Official website

Awards of the American Geographical Society
Awards established in 1902
1902 establishments in the United States